Permaculture is an approach to land management and settlement design that adopts arrangements observed in flourishing natural ecosystems. It includes a set of design principles derived using whole-systems thinking. It applies these principles in fields such as regenerative agriculture, town planning, rewilding, and community resilience. Permaculture originally came from "permanent agriculture", but was later adjusted to mean "permanent culture", incorporating social aspects. The term was coined in 1978 by Bill Mollison and David Holmgren, who formulated the concept in opposition to modern industrialized methods instead adopting a more traditional or "natural" approach to agriculture. 

Permaculture has many branches including ecological design, ecological engineering, regenerative design, environmental design, and construction. It also includes integrated water resources management, sustainable architecture, and regenerative and self-maintained habitat and agricultural systems modeled from natural ecosystems.

Permaculture uses creative design processes based on whole-systems thinking, considering all materials and energies in flow that affect or are affected by proposed changes. In practical terms it means that before, for example, modifying overland water flow, one fully considers both upstream and downstream effects in the short and long terms. Or, when looking at a "problem", such as brushy vegetation, one considers how removing or altering it will affect soil and wildlife, and how these interacting forces would evolve over time and space.

Permaculture has been criticised as being poorly defined and unscientific. Critics have pushed for less reliance on anecdote and extrapolation from ecological first principles, in favor of peer-reviewed research to substantiate productivity claims and to clarify methodology. Peter Harper from the Centre for Alternative Technology suggests that most of what passes for permaculture has no relevance to real problems.

History 

In 1929, Joseph Russell Smith appended King's antecedent term as the subtitle for Tree Crops: A Permanent Agriculture, which he wrote in response to widespread deforestation, plow agriculture, and erosion in the eastern mountains and hill regions of the USA. He proposed the planting of tree fruits and nuts as human and animal food crops that could stabilize watersheds and restore soil health. Smith saw the world as an inter-related whole and suggested mixed systems of trees with understory crops. This book inspired individuals such as Toyohiko Kagawa who pioneered forest farming in Japan in the 1930s. Tanaka in turn inspired the agricultural extension agent, Masanobu Fukuoka, whose later writings on natural farming influenced the growth of the permaculture movement. 

George Washington Carver developed what can now be called permaculture practices, the rotation of particular crops to restore nitrogen to the soil and repair damaged Southern farm land, in his work at Tuskegee Institute, beginning 1896 until his death in 1947.

In his 1964 book Water for Every Farm, the Australian agronomist and engineer P. A. Yeomans advanced a definition of permanent agriculture as one that can be sustained indefinitely. Yeomans introduced both an observation-based approach to land use in Australia in the 1940s and in the 1950s the Keyline Design as a way of managing the supply and distribution of water in semi-arid regions. Other early influences include Stewart Brand's works, Ruth Stout and Esther Deans, who pioneered no-dig gardening, and Masanobu Fukuoka who, in the late 1930s in Japan, began advocating no-till orchards and gardens and natural farming.

In the late 1960s, Bill Mollison, senior lecturer in Environmental Psychology at University of Tasmania, and David Holmgren, graduate student at the then Tasmanian College of Advanced Education started developing ideas about stable agricultural systems on the southern Australian island of Tasmania. Their recognition of the unsustainable nature of modern industrialized methods and their inspiration from Tasmanian Aboriginal and other traditional practises were critical to their formulation of permaculture. In their view, industrialized methods were highly dependent on non-renewable resources, and were additionally poisoning land and water, reducing biodiversity, and removing billions of tons of topsoil from previously fertile landscapes. They responded with permaculture. This term was first made public with the publication of their 1978 book Permaculture One.

Following the publication of Permaculture One, Mollison responded to widespread enthusiasm for the work by traveling and teaching a three-week program that became known as the Permaculture Design Course. It addressed the application of permaculture design to growing in major climatic and soil conditions, to the use of renewable energy and natural building methods, and to "invisible structures" of human society. He found ready audiences in Australia, New Zealand, the USA, Britain, and Europe, and from 1985 also reached the Indian subcontinent and southern Africa. Students of Mollison's Permaculture Design Course (PDC) included Max Lindegger, Lea Harrison, Robyn Francis, and Geoff Lawton in Australia, Tom Ward, Dave Jacke, Michael Pilarski, and Dan Hemenway in the USA, Andrew Langford in Britain, and Declan Kennedy and Margrit Kennedy in Europe. By the early 1980s, the concept had broadened from agricultural systems towards sustainable human habitats and at the 1st Intl. Permaculture Convergence, a gathering of graduates of the PDC held in Australia, the curriculum was formalized and its format shortened to two weeks. After Permaculture One, Mollison further refined and developed the ideas while designing hundreds of properties. This led to the 1988 publication of his global reference work, Permaculture: A Designers Manual. Mollison lectured in over 80 countries and taught the PDC to hundreds of students.  Mollison encouraged graduates to become teachers and set up their own institutes and demonstration sites. Critics suggest that this success weakened permaculture's social aspirations of moving away from industrial social forms. They argue that the self-help model (akin to franchising) has had the effect of creating market-focused social relationships that the originators initially opposed.

In the 1990s, the permaculture movement spread throughout Asia, Africa, and the Americas. In Hong Kong, the Asian Institute of Sustainable Architecture (AISA) was established. The Mesoamerican Permaculture Institute (IMAP) flourished in Guatemala. The Permaculture Institute of El Salvador is another example.

Foundational ethics 
The ethics on which permaculture builds are:
 "Care of the Earth: Provision for all life systems to continue and multiply".
 "Care of people: Provision for people to access those resources necessary for their existence"
 "Setting limits to population and consumption: By governing our own needs, we can set resources aside to further the above principles" Mollison  
Mollison's 1988 formulation of the third ethic was restated by Holmgren in 2002 as "Set limits to consumption and reproduction, and redistribute surplus" and is elsewhere condensed to "share the surplus".

Permaculture emphasizes patterns of landscape, function, and species assemblies. It determines where these elements should be placed so they can provide maximum benefit to the local environment. Permaculture maximizes useful connections between components and synergy of the final design. The focus of permaculture, therefore, is not on individual elements, but rather on the relationships among them. Properly done, the whole becomes greater than the sum of its parts. Permaculture seeks to minimize waste, human labor, and energy input and maximize benefits through synergy. 

Permaculture design is founded in replicating or imitating natural patterns found in ecosystems because these solutions have emerged through evolution over thousands of years and have proven to be effective. As a result, the implementation of permaculture design will vary widely depending on the region of the Earth it is located in. Because permaculture's implementation is so localized and place specific, scientific literature for the field is lacking or not always applicable. Design principles derive from the science of systems ecology and the study of pre-industrial examples of sustainable land use. Permaculture draws from disciplines including organic farming, agroforestry, integrated farming, sustainable development, physics, meteorology, sociology, anthropology, biochemistry, engineering, and applied ecology.

Theory

Design principles 

Holmgren articulated twelve permaculture design principles in his Permaculture: Principles and Pathways Beyond Sustainability:
 Observe and interact: Take time to engage with nature to design solutions that suit a particular situation.
 Catch and store energy: Develop systems that collect resources at peak abundance for use in times of need.
 Obtain a yield: Emphasize projects that generate meaningful rewards.
 Apply self-regulation and accept feedback: Discourage inappropriate activity to ensure that systems function well.
 Use and value renewable resources and services: Make the best use of nature's abundance: reduce consumption and dependence on non-renewable resources.
 Produce no waste: Value and employ all available resources: waste nothing.
 Design from patterns to details: Observe patterns in nature and society and use them to inform designs, later adding details.
 Integrate rather than segregate: Proper designs allow relationships to develop between design elements, allowing them to work together to support each other.
 Use small and slow solutions: Small and slow systems are easier to maintain, make better use of local resources, and produce more sustainable outcomes.
 Use and value diversity: Diversity reduces system-level vulnerability to threats and fully exploits its environment.
 Use edges and value the marginal: The border between things is where the most interesting events take place. These are often the system's most valuable, diverse, and productive elements.
 Creatively use and respond to change: A positive impact on inevitable change comes from careful observation, followed by well-timed intervention.

Layers 

Layers are a tool used to design sustainable ecosystems that directly benefit humans. A mature ecosystem has many relationships between its constituent parts such as trees, understory, ground cover, soil, fungi, insects, and animals. Because plants grow to different heights, a diverse community of organisms can occupy a relatively small space, each at a different layer. Forests offer seven basic layers, although there can be many more, such as fungi.
 Rhizosphere: Root layers within the soil. The major components of this layer are the soil and the organisms that live within it such as plant roots and zomes (including root crops such as potatoes and other edible tubers), fungi, insects, nematodes, worms, etc.
 Soil surface/groundcover: Overlaps with the herbaceous layer and the groundcover layer; however plants in this layer grow much closer to the ground, densely fill bare patches, and typically can tolerate some foot traffic. Cover crops retain soil and lessen erosion, along with green manures that add nutrients and organic matter, especially nitrogen.
 Herbaceous layer: Plants that die back to the ground every winter, if cold enough. No woody stems. Many beneficial plants such as culinary and medicinal herbs are in this layer. Annuals, biennials and perennials.
 Shrub layer: woody perennials of limited height. Includes most berry bushes.
 Understory layer: trees that flourish under the canopy.
 The canopy: the tallest trees. Large trees dominate, but typically do not saturate the area, i.e., some patches are devoid of trees.
 Vertical layer: climbers or vines, such as runner beans and lima beans (vine varieties).

Guilds 

A guild is a mutually beneficial group of species that form a part of the larger ecosystem. Within a guild each species provides a unique set of diverse services that work in harmony. Guilds include compatible animals, insects, and plants that form symbiotic relationships which produce healthier plants and ecosystems as well as useful resources for humans. Plants may be grown for food production, drawing nutrients from deep in the soil through tap roots, balancing nitrogen levels in the soil (legumes), for attracting beneficial insects to the garden, and repelling undesirable insects or pests. There are several types of guilds, such as community function guilds, mutual support guilds, and resource partitioning guilds.

 Community function guilds group species based on a specific function or niche that they fill in the garden. Examples of this type of guild include plants that attract a particular beneficial insect or plants that restore nitrogen to the soil. These types of guilds are aimed at solving specific problems which may arise in a garden, such as infestations of harmful insects and poor nutrition in the soil.
 Establishment guilds are commonly used when working to establish target species (the primary vegetables, fruits, herbs, etc. you want to be established in your garden) with the support of pioneer species (plants that will help the target species succeed). For example, in temperate climates, plants such as comfrey (as a weed barrier and dynamic accumulator), lupine (as a nitrogen fixer), and daffodil (as a gopher deterrent) can together form a guild for a fruit tree. As the tree matures, the support plants will likely eventually be shaded out and can be used as compost.
 Mature guilds form once your target species are established. For example, if the tree layer of your landscape closes its canopy, sun-loving support plants will be shaded out and die. Shade loving medicinal herbs such as ginseng, Black Cohosh, and goldenseal can be planted as an understory.
 Mutual support guilds group species together that are complementary by working together and supporting each other. This guild may include a plant that fixes nitrogen, a plant that hosts insects that are predators to pests, and another plant that attracts pollinators. An example of a mutual support guild is mycorrhizal fungi's symbiotic relationship with plants by providing minerals and nitrogen to plant roots and receiving sugars in return has been cited as an example of the mutualistic guild. Permaculturalists take advantage of this beneficial relationship when designing their garden layouts.
 Resource partitioning guilds group species based on their abilities to share essential resources with one another through a process of niche differentiation. A potential example of this type of guild includes placing a fibrous- or shallow-rooted plant next to a tap-rooted plant so that they draw from different levels of soil nutrients.

Edge effect 

The edge effect in ecology is the effect of juxtaposing contrasting environments in an ecosystem. Permaculturists argue that where differing systems meet can become highly productive and offer useful connections. An example of this is a coast. Where land and sea meet is a rich area that meets a disproportionate percentage of human and animal needs. This idea is reflected in permacultural designs by using spirals in herb gardens, or creating ponds that have wavy undulating shorelines rather than a simple circle or oval (thereby increasing the amount of edge for a given area).

Zones 

Zones intelligently organize design elements in a human environment based on the frequency of human use and plant or animal needs. Frequently manipulated or harvested elements of the design are located close to the house in zones 1 and 2. Manipulated elements located further away are used less frequently. Zones are numbered from 0 to 5 based on positioning.
 Zone 0
 The house, or home center. Here permaculture principles aim to reduce energy and water needs harnessing natural resources such as sunlight, to create a harmonious, sustainable environment in which to live and work. Zone 0 is an informal designation, which is not specifically defined in Mollison's book.
 Zone 1
 The zone nearest to the house, the location for those elements in the system that require frequent attention, or that need to be visited often, such as salad crops, herb plants, soft fruit like strawberries or raspberries, greenhouse and cold frames, propagation area, worm compost bin for kitchen waste, etc. Raised beds are often used in Zone 1 in urban areas.
 Zone 2
 This area is used for siting perennial plants that require less frequent maintenance, such as occasional weed control or pruning, including currant bushes and orchards, pumpkins, sweet potato, etc. Also, a good place for beehives, larger-scale composting bins, etc.
 Zone 3
 The area where main crops are grown, both for domestic use and for trade purposes. After establishment, care and maintenance required are fairly minimal (provided mulches and similar things are used), such as watering or weed control maybe once a week.
 Zone 4
 A semi-wild area, mainly used for forage and collecting wild plants as well as production of timber for construction or firewood.
 Zone 5
 A wilderness area. Humans do not intervene in zone 5 apart from observing natural ecosystems and cycles. This zone hosts a natural reserve of bacteria, molds, and insects that can aid the zones above it.

People care 
A core theme of permaculture is the idea of "people care". Seeking prosperity begins within a local community or culture that can apply the tenets of permaculture to sustain an environment that supports them and vice versa. This is in stark contrast to typical modern industrialized societies, where locality and generational knowledge is often overlooked in the pursuit of wealth or other forms of societal leverage.

The tragic reality is that very few sustainable systems are designed or applied by those who hold power, and the reason for this is obvious and simple: to let people arrange their own food, energy and shelter is to lose economic and political control over them. We should cease to look to power structures, hierarchical systems, or governments to help us, and devise ways to help ourselves. - Bill Mollison

Common practices

Agroforestry 

Agroforestry uses the interactive benefits from combining trees and shrubs with crops or livestock. It combines agricultural and forestry technologies to create more diverse, productive, profitable, healthy and sustainable land-use systems. Trees or shrubs are intentionally used within agricultural systems, or non-timber forest products are cultured in forest settings.

Forest gardening/food forests involve systems designed to mimic natural forests. Forest gardens, like other permaculture designs, incorporate processes and relationships that the designers understand to be valuable in natural ecosystems.

Proponents of forest gardens include Graham Bell, Patrick Whitefield, Dave Jacke, Eric Toensmeier and Geoff Lawton. Bell started building his forest garden in 1991 and wrote The Permaculture Garden in 1995, Whitefield wrote the book How to Make a Forest Garden in 2002, Jacke and Toensmeier co-authored the two volume book set Edible Forest Gardening in 2005, and Lawton presented the film Establishing a Food Forest in 2008.

Tree Gardens, such as Kandyan tree gardens, in South and Southeast Asia, are often hundreds of years old. It is not evident whether they came from agroforestry or permaculture. Many studies of these systems, especially those that predate the term permaculture, consider these systems to be forms of agroforestry.

Suburban and urban permaculture 

The fundamental element of suburban and urban permaculture is the efficient utilization of space. Maximizing the space for food production and minimizing wasted space is important. Wildfire journal suggests using methods such as the keyhole garden to address this issue of space. Neighbors can also collaborate with each other to increase the scale of transformation. Sites such as recreation centers, neighborhood associations, city programs, faith groups, and schools can become part of a larger social and economic movement. Columbia, an ecovillage in Portland, Oregon, consisting of 37 apartment condominiums, influenced surrounding neighbors to implement similar green-minded principles of permaculture, including front-yard gardens. Suburban permaculture sites such as one in Eugene, Oregon, include rainwater catchment, edible landscaping, removing paved driveways, turning a garage into living space, changing a south side patio into passive solar, aesthetic features, detached structures. 

Transforming vacant lots in suburban and urban settings is a common practice of creating community-managed agriculture or farm sites. However, some of these farm sites are perceived by local authorities as temporary or informal solutions to the vacant lot rather than as permanent fixtures of the city. This threatens the fundamental principal of permaculture: permanence. For example, Los Angeles' South Central Farm (1994–2006), which was one of the largest urban gardens in the United States, was bulldozed with approval from property owner Ralph Horowitz, despite large-scale protest from the community who had developed deep bonds with the site.

The possibilities and challenges for developing suburban or urban permaculture differ greatly as a result of how the built environment is designed and property is treated in particular areas of the world. For example, a study comparing the built environment in Jaisalmer, India, and Los Angeles, United States, concluded that the American planned city is ecologically disastrous:

the application of universal rules regarding setbacks from roads and property lines systematically creates unused and purposeless space as an integral part of the built landscape, well beyond the classic image of the vacant lot. ... Because these spaces are created in accordance with a general pattern, rather than responding to any local need or desire, many if not most are underutilized, unproductive, and generally maintained as ecologically disastrous lawns by unenthusiastic owners. In this broadest understanding of wasted land, the concept is opened to reveal how our system of urban design gives rise to a ubiquitous pattern of land that, while not usually conceived as vacant, is in fact largely without ecological or social value.

Hügelkultur 

Hügelkultur is the practice of burying wood to increase soil water retention. The porous structure of wood acts like a sponge when decomposing underground. During the rainy season, sufficient buried wood can absorb enough water to sustain crops through the dry season. This technique is a traditional practice that has been developed over centuries in Europe and has been recently adopted by permaculturalists. The Hügelkultur technique can be implemented through building mounds on the ground as well as in raised garden beds. In raised beds, the practice "imitates natural nutrient cycling found in wood decomposition and the high water-holding capacities of organic detritus, while also improving bed structure and drainage properties." This is done by placing wood material (e.g. logs and sticks) in the bottom of the bed before piling organic soil and compost on top. A study comparing the water retention capacities of Hügel raised beds to non-Hügel beds determined that Hügel beds are both lower maintenance and more efficient in the long term by requiring less irrigation.

Vermicomposting 

Vermicomposting is a common practice in permaculture. The practice involves using earthworms, such as red wigglers, to break down green and brown waste. The worms produce worm castings, which can be used to organically fertilize the garden. Worms are also introduced to garden beds, helping to aerate the soil and improve water retention. Worms may multiply quickly if provided conditions are ideal. For example, a permaculture farm in Cuba began with 9 tiger worms in 2001 and 15 years later had a population of over 500,000. The worm castings are particularly useful as part of a seed starting mix and regular fertilizer. Worm castings are reportedly more successful than conventional compost for seed starting.

Natural building 

Natural building involves using a range of building systems and materials that apply permaculture principles. The focus is on durability and the use of minimally processed, plentiful, or renewable resources, as well as those that, while recycled or salvaged, produce healthy living environments and maintain indoor air quality. For example, cement, a common building material, emits carbon dioxide and is harmful to the environment while natural building works with the environment, using materials that are biodegradable, such as cob, adobe, rammed earth (unburnt clay), and straw bale (which insulates as well as modern synthetic materials).

Natural building attempts to lessen environmental impacts of buildings without sacrificing comfort, health, or aesthetics. Natural building employs abundantly available natural materials (e.g., clay, rock, sand, straw, wood, reeds), and draws heavily on traditional architectural strategies found in various climates. Building compactly and minimizing the ecological footprint is common, as are on-site handling of energy acquisition, on-site water capture, alternate sewage treatment, and water reuse. Most materials are sourced regionally, locally, or even on-site. Roofing coverings often include sod or 'living roofs', thatch, and wooden shakes or shingles. Rubble trench foundations are popular, as they do not require concrete. Likewise, dry-stacked or lime mortared stem walls are common. Natural builders also regularly combine wall systems in a single building, making the best use of for example each material's thermal or water-resistant properties.

Rainwater harvesting 

Rainwater harvesting is the accumulation and storage of rainwater for reuse before it runs off or reaches the aquifer. It has been used to provide drinking water, water for livestock, and water for irrigation, as well as other typical uses. Rainwater collected from the roofs of houses and local institutions can make an important contribution to the availability of drinking water. It can supplement the water table and increase urban greenery. Water collected from the ground, sometimes from areas which are specially prepared for this purpose, is called stormwater harvesting.

Greywater is wastewater generated from domestic activities such as laundry, dishwashing, and bathing, which can be recycled for uses such as landscape irrigation and constructed wetlands. Greywater is largely sterile, but not potable (drinkable). Greywater differs from water from sewage or blackwater that contains human or animal waste. A permaculture approach to blackwater is composting through a process known as humanure; a portmanteau of human and manure. The methane in humanure can be collected and used similar to natural gas as a fuel, such as for heating or cooking, and is commonly referred to as biogas. Biogas can be harvested from human waste and the remainder used as humanure. The simplest forms of humanure include a composting toilet or an outhouse or dry bog surrounded by trees that are heavy feeders that can be coppiced for wood fuel. This process eliminates the use of a plumbed toilet.

Domesticated animals 

Domesticated animals are often incorporated into site design. Animals are a critical component of any sustainable ecosystem. Research indicates that without animals' contribution, ecological integrity is diminished or lost. Activities that contribute to the system include: foraging to cycle nutrients, clearing fallen fruit, weed maintenance, spreading seeds, and pest maintenance. Nutrients are cycled by animals, transformed from their less digestible form (such as grass or twigs) into more nutrient-dense manure.

Multiple animals can contribute, including cows, goats, chickens, geese, turkey, rabbits, and worms. An example is chickens who can be used to scratch over the soil, thus breaking down the topsoil and using fecal matter as manure. Factors such as timing and habits are critical. For example, animals require much more daily attention than plants.

Sheet mulching 
Mulch is a protective cover placed over soil. Mulch material includes stones, leaves, cardboard, wood chips, and gravel, although in permaculture mulches of organic material are preferred because they perform more functions. These include absorbing rainfall, reducing evaporation, providing nutrients, increasing soil organic matter, creating habitat for soil organisms, suppressing weed growth and seed germination, moderating diurnal temperature swings, protecting against frost, and reducing erosion. Sheet mulching is a gardening technique that attempts to mimic natural forest processes. Sheet mulching mimics the leaf cover that is found on forest floors. When deployed properly and in combination with other permaculture principles, it can generate healthy, productive, and low-maintenance ecosystems.

Sheet mulch serves as a "nutrient bank," storing nutrients contained in organic matter and slowly making these nutrients available to plants as the organic matter slowly and naturally breaks down. It also improves the soil by attracting and feeding earthworms, slaters and many other soil micro-organisms, as well as adding humus. Earthworms "till" the soil, and their worm castings are among the best fertilizers and soil conditioners. Sheet mulching can be used to reduce or eliminate non-desired plants by starving them of light and can surpass herbicide or other methods of control.

Grazing 

Grazing is blamed for much destruction. However, when grazing is modeled after nature, it can have the opposite effect. Cell grazing is a system of grazing in which herds or flocks are regularly and systematically moved to fresh range with the intent to maximize forage quality and quantity. Sepp Holzer and Joel Salatin have shown how grazing can start ecological succession or prepare ground for planting. Allan Savory's holistic management technique has been likened to "a permaculture approach to rangeland management". One variation is conservation grazing, where the primary purpose of the animals is to benefit the environment and the animals are not necessarily used for meat, milk or fiber. Sheep can replace lawn mowers. Goats and sheep can eat invasive plants.

Keyline design 
Keyline design is a technique for maximizing the beneficial use of water resources. It was developed in Australia by farmer and engineer P. A. Yeomans. Keyline refers to a contour line extending in both directions from a keypoint. Plowing above and below the keyline provides a watercourse that directs water away from a purely downhill course to reduce erosion and encourage infiltration. It is used in designing drainage systems.

Fruit tree management 
Some proponents of permaculture advocate heavily restricted pruning. Holzer used the method in connection with Hügelkultur berms. He has grown fruiting trees at altitudes (approximately ) far above their normal altitude, temperature, and snow load ranges. The Hügelkultur berms kept or generated enough heat to allow the roots to survive during alpine winter conditions. The point of having unpruned branches, he notes, was that the longer (more naturally formed) branches bend over under the snow load until they touched the ground, thus forming a natural arch against snow loads that would break a shorter, pruned, branch.

Masanobu Fukuoka, as part of early experiments on his family farm in Japan, experimented with no-pruning methods, noting that he ended up killing many fruit trees by simply letting them go, which made them become convoluted and tangled, and thus unhealthy. He learned that this is the difference between natural-form trees and previously-pruned fruit trees. He concluded that trees should be raised entirely without pruning, allowing them to form healthy and efficient natural branch patterns. This reflects the Tao-philosophy of Wú wéi translated in part as no-action (against nature). He interpreted this as no unnecessary pruning, nature farming or "do-nothing" farming, of fruit trees, distinct from non-intervention or literal no-pruning. He ultimately achieved yields comparable to or exceeding standard/intensive practices of using pruning and chemical fertilisation.

Marine systems 

Permaculture derives its origin from agriculture, although the same principles, especially its foundational ethics, can also be applied to mariculture, particularly seaweed farming. An example is Marine Permaculture wherein artificial upwelling of cold, deep ocean water is induced. When attachment substrate is provided in association with such an upwelling, and kelp sporophytes are present, a kelp forest ecosystem can be established (kelp needs the cool temperatures and abundant dissolved macronutrients present in such an environment). Microalgae proliferate as well. Marine forest habitat is beneficial for many fish species, and the kelp is a renewable resource for food, animal feed, medicines and various other commercial products. It is also a powerful tool for carbon fixation. 

The upwelling can be powered by renewable energy on location. Vertical mixing has been reduced due to ocean stratification effects associated with climate change. The Permian Mass Extinction was thought to have been brought on by such ocean warming, stratification, deoxygenation, anoxia, and subsequent extinction of 96% of all marine species. Reduced vertical mixing and marine heatwaves have decimated seaweed ecosystems in many areas. Marine permaculture mitigates this by restoring some vertical mixing and preserves these important ecosystems. By preserving and regenerating habitat offshore on a platform, marine permaculture employs natural processes to regenerate marine life.

Intellectual property 
Trademark and copyright disputes surround the word permaculture. Mollison's books claimed on the copyright page, "The contents of this book and the word PERMACULTURE are copyright." Eventually Mollison acknowledged that he was mistaken and that no copyright protection existed.

In 2000, Mollison's U.S.-based Permaculture Institute sought a service mark for the word permaculture when used in educational services such as conducting classes, seminars, or workshops. The service mark would have allowed Mollison and his two institutes to set enforceable guidelines regarding how permaculture could be taught and who could teach it, particularly with relation to the PDC, despite the fact that he had been certifying teachers since 1993. This attempt failed and was abandoned in 2001. Mollison's application for trademarks in Australia for the terms "Permaculture Design Course" and "Permaculture Design" was withdrawn in 2003. In 2009 he sought a trademark for "Permaculture: A Designers' Manual" and "Introduction to Permaculture", the names of two of his books. These applications were withdrawn in 2011. Australia has never authorized a trademark for the word permaculture.

Criticism 
Permaculture has been criticised as being poorly defined and unscientific. Critics have pushed for less reliance on anecdote and extrapolation from ecological first principles, in favor of peer-reviewed research to substantiate productivity claims and to clarify methodology. Peter Harper from the Centre for Alternative Technology suggests that most of what passes for permaculture has no relevance to real problems.

Defenders respond that permaculture is not yet a mainstream scientific tradition and lacks the resources of mainstream industrial agriculture.  Ferguson and Lovell point out that permaculturalists rarely engage with mainstream research in agroecology, agroforestry, or ecological engineering, and claim that mainstream science has an elitist or pro-corporate bias.

Aquaculture 
In his books Sustainable Freshwater Aquaculture and Farming in Ponds and Dams, Nick Romanowski expresses the view that the presentation of aquaculture in Bill Mollison's books is unrealistic and misleading.

Agroforestry 
Greg Williams argues that forests cannot be more productive than farmland because the net productivity of forests declines as they mature due to ecological succession. Permaculture proponents respond that this is true only when comparing data between woodland forest and climax vegetation, but not when comparing farmland vegetation against a woodland forest. For example, ecological succession generally results in rising productivity until it reaches the woodland state (67% tree cover), before declining until full maturity.

See also 

 Agrarianism
 Agroecology
 Aquaponics
 Botany
 Biochar
 Biodynamic agriculture
 Biointensive agriculture
 Biomimetics
 Climate-friendly gardening
 David Holmgren
 Ecology
 Ethnobotany
 Food-feed system
 Forest gardening
 Geoff Lawton
 Holzer Permaculture
 List of culinary fruits
 List of leaf vegetables
 List of Japanese ingredients#Vegetables
 List of permaculture projects
 Microponics
 Natural farming
 Namul
 Paul Wheaton
 Plant community
 Regenerative agriculture
 Seed saving
 Sepp Holzer
 Willie Smits
 Zaï

References

Citations

General and cited works 

 .
 .
 .
  – The first systematic review of the permaculture literature, from the perspective of agroecology.
 .
 .
 ; .
 
 .
 .
 .
 .
 .
 Jacke, Dave with Eric Toensmeier. Edible Forest Gardens. Volume I: Ecological Vision and Theory for Temperate-Climate Permaculture, Volume II: Ecological Design and Practice for Temperate-Climate Permaculture. Edible Forest Gardens (US) 2005
 .
 .
 .
 Loofs, Mona. Permaculture, Ecology and Agriculture: An investigation into Permaculture theory and practice using two case studies in northern New South Wales Honours thesis, Human Ecology Program, Department of Geography, Australian National University 1993
 Macnamara, Looby. People and Permaculture: caring and designing for ourselves, each other and the planet. [Permanent Publications] (UK) (2012) .
 .
 .
 .
 Odum, H. T., Jorgensen, S.E. and Brown, M.T. 'Energy hierarchy and transformity in the universe', in Ecological Modelling, 178, pp. 17–28 (2004).
 Paull, J. "Permanent Agriculture: Precursor to Organic Farming", Journal of Bio-Dynamics Tasmania, no.83, pp. 19–21, 2006. Organic eprints.
 .
 .
 Shepard, Mark: Restoration Agriculture – Redesigning Agriculture in Nature's Image, Acres US, 2013, 
 .
 .
 Woodrow, Linda. The Permaculture Home Garden. Penguin Books (Australia).
 Yeomans, P.A. Water for Every Farm: A practical irrigation plan for every Australian property, KG Murray, Sydney, NSW, Australia (1973).

External links 

 A quarter-acre suburban property in Eugene, Oregon – grass to garden, reclaiming automobile space, elevated/edible landscape, rainwater catchment, passive solar design, education
 Our Permaculture Life - free online videos, articles and a podcast from permaculture elder Morag Gamble.
 Ethics and principles of permaculture (Holmgren's)
 Ethos Foundation - Supports free permaculture education to thousands of refugees - particularly youth and women mainly in Africa. 
 Noosa Forest Retreat – one of the world's oldest permaculture communities located at Noosa, Queensland, Australia (founded by Ian Trew) – formerly "Mothar Mountain Ashram".
 Permaculture Education Institute - Offers comprehensive online permaculture teacher education for those who want to make permaculture their way of life and livelihood. The course funds the Ethos Foundation and Permayouth.
 Pendragon Permaculture on Orcas Island, Washington, in cooperation with All Hands on Earth, provides support for public and private organizations to establish permaculture programs.
 Permaculture – Sustainability and sustainable development
 Permaculture a Beginners Guide – a 'pictorial walkthrough'
 Permaculture Commons is a collection of permaculture material under free licenses
 Permaculture Online Community – Permaculture Online Community & Online Permaculture Education, run independently by Noosa Forest Retreat.
 The 15 pamphlets based on the 1981 Permaculture Design Course given by Bill Mollison  (co-founder of permaculture) all in 1 PDF file.
 The Permaculture Activist is a co-evolving quarterly produced by part-time contributors
 The Permaculture Association, UK.
 The Permaculture Research Institute – Permaculture Forums, Courses, Information, News and Worldwide Reports.
 The Worldwide Permaculture Network – Database of permaculture people and projects worldwide.
 Urban Permaculture Design – a city lot with over a hundred perennial edible varieties. Permaculture land acquisition discussion.

 
 
Australian inventions
Environmental design
Environmental social science concepts
Horticulture
Landscape architecture
Rural community development
Sustainable agriculture
Sustainable design
Sustainable food system
Sustainable gardening
Systems ecology